Mustilia soosi is a moth in the family Endromidae. It was described by Vadim V. Zolotuhin in 2007. It is found in Thailand.

References

Moths described in 2007
Mustilia